Lance Ratchford (born October 5, 1988) is an American baseball coach and former infielder, who is the current head baseball coach of the Marist Red Foxes. He played college baseball at Mansfield University of Pennsylvania from 2008 to 2010 before transferring to Keystone College. He has also been the head coach of the SUNY Cobleskill Fighting Tigers (2019–2022). After the 2022 season Ratchford was named North Atlantic Conference (NAC) Coach of the Year.

Playing career
Ratchford attended Oneonta High School in Oneonta, New York. During his senior year Ratchford earned 2nd Team All-State honors from the NYSSWA. He would go on to play college baseball at Mansfield University of Pennsylvania from 2008 to 2010 before transferring to Keystone College. As a senior in 2011, he helped Keystone advance to the NCAA Division III World Series, where they finished tied for third. The Giants won the New York Regional tournament and he was named to the NCAA Regional All-Tournament Team. The 2011 Keystone team was inducted into the school’s Hall of Fame in 2021.

Coaching career
On August 9, 2022, Ratchford was named the head coach of the Marist Red Foxes.

Head coaching record

References

External links
 Marist Red Foxes bio

Keystone Giants baseball players
Mansfield Mounties baseball players
Marist Red Foxes baseball coaches
Oneonta State Red Dragons baseball coaches
Cobleskill State Fighting Tigers baseball coaches
Baseball players from New York (state)
1988 births
Living people
Baseball coaches from New York (state)